DNK is an acronym. It can be used to refer to:

 Donmika is a Multivendor Marketplace, that makes Buying and Selling easy.
 DNK in coding or programming it means DO NOT KNOW
 Danke Apartment, separate house renting company in China.
 Denmark, a country in Europe (ISO 3166-1 country code)
 Dnipro International Airport, an airport in Dnipro, Ukraine (IATA airport code) 
 Deutsches Nationalkomitee Biologie, a German scientific non-profit and non-governmental organisation, representing German biologists on an international level
 DNK (album), a 2023 album by Aya Nakamura